Ulus was a Turkish newspaper published between 1934–1971 in Ankara, Turkey, with some interruptions.

Naming
Ulus means "nation" in Turkish. It was owned and published by the Republican People's Party (CHP) which was founded by Turkish nationalists during the Turkish War of Independence in the 1920s.

History

First term
Ulus was founded on 29 November 1934 as a successor to Hakimiyet-i Milliye. It was owned by the CHP. After the party was defeated in the 1950 elections, the new ruling party, Democrat Party decided to expropriate all property CHP owned on the ground that the property had been acquired during the single-party regime (1923–1945). On 17 December 1953, the infrastructure of the newspaper such as the building and the publishing equipment was expropriated and the newspaper was closed.

Second term
Although the newspaper was closed, the party still owned the royalty, but because of financial problems, Ulus could not be published for one and a half years. During this period Nihat Erim a member of the party (and a future prime minister) published his own newspaper (named Yeni Ulus and later Halkçı) as a replacement. Finally on 10 June 1955 Ulus began its second publishing term. One of the contributors was Hüsnü A. Göksel between 1961 and 1963 who also served as its correspondent while studying in the USA in the late 1950s.

Aftermath
In 1971, CHP sold the newspaper to a publisher who changed the name of the newspaper to Barış. In 2008 it was renamed as Ulus.

References

Republican People's Party (Turkey)
Turkish-language newspapers
Publications established in 1934
Publications disestablished in 1971
Defunct daily newspapers
1934 establishments in Turkey
1971 disestablishments in Turkey
Defunct newspapers published in Turkey
Mass media in Ankara
Daily newspapers published in Turkey